Avignonet-Lauragais is a commune in the Haute-Garonne department in southwestern France.

History 
In 1242 Avignonet-Lauragais was the site of a massacre of Inquisitors by members of a heretical garrison at the Castle of Montségur. The massacre led to the Siege of Montségur.

Population

Twin towns
Avignonet-Lauragais is twinned with:
 Avinyonet de Puigventós, Spain

See also
Communes of the Haute-Garonne department

References

Communes of Haute-Garonne